The 1904 Kentucky Derby was the 30th running of the Kentucky Derby. The race took place on May 2, 1904. This year in Derby history is notable for several important firsts. Elwood, the winning horse, was owned by Lasca Durnell which marked the first time a female owner won the Derby. The winner was bred by Emma Holt Prather of Faustiana Stock Farm in Nodaway County, Missouri and was the first time a Derby winner was bred by a woman. In addition, Elwood was the first winner bred in the state of Missouri and through 2020 no other winner has been bred in that state.

Full results

 Winning Breeder: Emma Holt Prather; (MO)

Payout
 The winner received a purse of $4,850.
 Second place received $700.
 Third place received $300.

References

1904
Kentucky Derby
Derby
May 1904 sports events
1904 in American sports